Elsebeth Gerner Nielsen (born 5 January 1960) is a Danish politician.

Life
Nielsen graduated from Odense University, and was subsequently assigned as education assistant at the university. She was elected member of Folketinget for the Danish Social Liberal Party from 1994 to 2007. She was Minister for Culture in Poul Nyrup Rasmussen's fourth cabinet from 1998 to 2001.

She is married and has four children.

In March 2020 she tested positive for coronavirus.

External links 
 Folketing.dK: Elisebeth Gerner Nielsen

References

1960 births
Living people
Danish Culture Ministers
Danish Social Liberal Party politicians
21st-century Danish women politicians
Women government ministers of Denmark
University of Southern Denmark alumni